Paul McClaran Dini (born August 7, 1957) is an American screenwriter and comic creator. He has been a producer and writer for several Warner Bros. Animation/DC Comics animated series, most notably Batman: The Animated Series (1992–1995), and the subsequent DC Animated Universe. Dini and Bruce Timm co-created the characters Harley Quinn and Terry McGinnis.

Dini began writing for Warner Bros. Animation on Tiny Toon Adventures. In addition to Batman: The Animated Series, Dini was a writer for Superman: The Animated Series (1996–2000), writer and co-creator for The New Batman Adventures (1997–1999), and writer and developer for Batman Beyond (1999–2001). He also co-created Freakazoid! (1995–1997) with Timm, produced Duck Dodgers (2003–2005), developed and scripted Krypto the Superdog (2005–2006). After leaving Warner Bros. Animation in early 2004, Dini went on to write and story edit the first season of the ABC adventure series Lost. Dini wrote the storylines for the Batman: Arkham Asylum and Batman: Arkham City video games. In 2010, he created the live action drama series Tower Prep for Cartoon Network.

He has written a number of comic books for DC Comics. Dini and Timm collaborated on The Batman Adventures: Mad Love, which won the Eisner Award for Best Single Story in 1994. Dini and illustrator Alex Ross created the graphic novels Superman: Peace on Earth, Batman: War on Crime, Shazam! Power of Hope, and Wonder Woman: Spirit of Truth. His original creations include Jingle Belle, Sheriff Ida Red, and Madame Mirage.

Early life
Paul Dini was born on August 7, 1957 in New York City to Patricia (McClaran) and Robert Dini, an advertising executive. He is of Italian descent through his father. Dini attended Stevenson School in Pebble Beach, California on an art scholarship. He attended Emerson College in Boston, where he earned a BFA degree in creative writing.

During college, he began doing freelance animation scripts for Filmation, and a number of other studios. In 1984, he was hired to work for George Lucas on several of his animation projects. Dini later returned to the Star Wars universe in 2007 to script several episodes of Star Wars: The Clone Wars.

Career

1980s
Dini wrote episodes for the 1983–1985 animated TV series, He-Man and the Masters of the Universe, as well as contributing to interviews on the released box sets of the series. He wrote an episode for the Dungeons & Dragons cartoon in 1983, an episode of the Generation One Transformers cartoon series, "The Dweller in The Depths," an episode of the 1985 G.I. Joe cartoon called "Jungle Trap", and contributed to various episodes of the Star Wars: Ewoks animated series, several of which included rare appearances from the Empire.

1990s
In 1989, Dini was hired at Warner Bros. Animation to work on Tiny Toon Adventures. Later, he moved onto Batman: The Animated Series, where he worked as a writer, producer and editor, later working on Superman: The Animated Series, The New Batman Adventures, and Batman Beyond. Dini was the writer for the episode "Heart of Ice", which redefined Mr. Freeze as a tragic character and won a Daytime Emmy Award for Outstanding Writing in an Animated Program. He continued working with WB animation, working on a number of internal projects, including Krypto the Superdog and Duck Dodgers, until 2004. In 1989 and 1990, he contributed scripts to the live-action television horror anthology series Monsters: "One Wolf's Family" and "Talk Nice to Me". Along with Bruce Timm, he created the animated series Freakazoid!.

He has earned five Emmy awards for his animation work. In a related effort, Dini was the co-author with Chip Kidd of Batman Animated, a 1998 non-fiction coffee table book about the animated Batman franchise.

Dini and Bruce Timm introduced Harley Quinn in Batman: The Animated Series as her first appearance was the episode "Joker's Favor" and in 1994, they adapted the character into comics in The Batman Adventures: Mad Love one-shot. In 1994, Dini and Timm won both the Eisner Award for Best Single Story and the Harvey Award for Best Single Issue or Story for Mad Love. Dini won the same Eisner prize the next year as well, for Batman Adventures Holiday Special, (a one-shot with several Christmas-themed stories) with Timm, Ronnie del Carmen, and others. Harley Quinn was integrated into the mainstream DC Comics continuity in the Batman: Harley Quinn one-shot published in 1999. In Batman Beyond, Dini and Timm co-created Terry McGinnis, the teenage Batman of the future, and his supporting cast. Dini has written several comics stories for DC Comics, including an oversized graphic novel series illustrated by painter Alex Ross featuring Superman (Superman: Peace on Earth), Batman (Batman: War on Crime), Shazam (Shazam! Power of Hope), Wonder Woman (Wonder Woman: Spirit of Truth), and the Justice League (Secret Origins and Liberty and Justice). A hardcover collection of the Dini and Ross stories was published in 2005 under the title The World's Greatest Super-Heroes. Among Dini's original creations is Jingle Belle, the rebellious teen-age daughter of Santa Claus.

2000s
In 2002, Dini created Sheriff Ida Red, the super-powered cowgirl star of a series of books set in Dini's mythical town of Mutant, Texas. He collaborated with Kevin Smith on Clerks: The Animated Series. He and Bruce Timm collaborated on the Harley and Ivy limited series for DC in 2004. Dini became the writer for DC Comics' Detective Comics as of issue #821 (Sept. 2006) and created a new version of the Ventriloquist in #827 (March 2007). While Grant Morrison was starting a seven-year Batman story on the Batman title composed of long, interlinking arcs, Dini wrote a number of single-issue stories over the following year as well as two crossovers with Morrison's Batman, one focusing on the resurrection of Ra's al Ghul and another on the return of Hush. After Morrison's "Batman R.I.P." storyline in 2009, creators were moved around titles and Dini started writing two new Batman titles Batman: Streets of Gotham and Gotham City Sirens. Streets of Gotham started and ended with story arcs about Hush while Gotham City Sirens focused on the women of Gotham; he wrote the bulk of both titles during their existence including the first and last issue of both.

In 2006 he announced that he was writing a hardcover graphic novel starring Zatanna and Black Canary. In 2006, Dini was on the writing staff for the first season of the ABC adventure series Lost. The Lost writers were awarded at the 2006 Writers Guild of America Awards for Outstanding Achievement in Writing for a Dramatic Television Series. The following year he was the head writer of DC's weekly series, Countdown. Dini co-wrote a draft script for the ill-fated Science Ninja Team Gatchaman movie, which never saw the light of day and resulted in him leaving the project. Dini wrote a series for Top Cow Productions, based in a character he created, Madame Mirage. In July 2008, Dini started a partnership with GoAnimate to launch his Super Rica & Rashy series on the platform.

Dini returned to Batman animated adaptations to write the Batman: The Brave and the Bold episode "Legends of the Dark Mite". In the same episode, he appeared in an animated form wearing Harley Quinn's costume in a comic book convention parody scene, along with Bruce Timm wearing Joker's costume next to him. He would go on to write several additional episodes for the series, including "Chill of the Night!", which contained a team-up between Batman and Zatanna, one of Dini's favorite characters. Dini penned the storyline for the Rocksteady Studios video game Batman: Arkham Asylum, released on August 25, 2009. He wrote three episodes of Star Wars: The Clone Wars: "Cloak of Darkness," "Holocron Heist," and "Voyage of Temptation." On February 14, 2008, the first edition of Dini's column, "200 Words with Paul Dini" was released on the iFanboy site.

2010s
Dini is the main creator of the live action drama Tower Prep Cartoon Network series. On August 4, 2010, it was confirmed that Dini will be involved in Marvel Comics' upcoming animated series Ultimate Spider-Man, which aired on Disney XD in 2012. He worked on Hulk and the Agents of S.M.A.S.H., an animated series centered around the Hulk and his supporting cast. Dini worked with Rocksteady studios once again to create Batman: Arkham City, which was a sequel to Batman: Arkham Asylum. He wrote a five-issue comic series set in the game continuity. A building in Arkham City is named Dini Towers in tribute. He did not write the storyline of the third Rocksteady game in the series, Batman: Arkham Knight, due to the company not wanting to hire freelance writers for future games.

Dini wrote the script for Bloodspell, an original graphic novel starring Black Canary and Zatanna. He also performed rewrites on Disney's dark fantasy film Maleficent. His graphic novel Dark Night: A True Batman Story, based on a mugging he experienced in 1993, was published in June 2016. Dini wrote the "Actionland!" chapter in Action Comics #1000 (June 2018) which was drawn by José Luis García-López and Kevin Nowlan.

Paul Dini and his wife, magician Misty Lee, created an online interview feature called "Monkey Talk" on Kevin Smith's website, Quick Stop Entertainment.com. Dini and Misty Lee appeared on Ken Reid's TV Guidance Counselor podcast on April 6, 2016.

2020s
In September 2020, DC Comics announced that Dini would be among the creators of a revived Batman: Black and White anthology series to debut on December 8, 2020. Dini wrote the prequel to Scoob!, Scoob! Holiday Haunt, set to release through HBO Max. It was canceled in August 2022 by Warner Bros. Discovery.

Personal life
Dini and his wife Misty Lee, a magician and voiceover actress, live in Los Angeles. Their two Boston terriers, Mugsy and Deuce, were featured in "Anger Management", a 2012 episode of The Dog Whisperer, in which they sought Cesar Millan's help with their dogs' behavioral problems. Around this time, Dini began an extensive weight loss and exercise regimen which combined dog obedience training.

Screenwriting credits

Television
Head writer credits are denoted in bold
The New Adventures of Mighty Mouse and Heckle %26 Jeckle (1979)
Tarzan, Lord of the Jungle (1979)
Fat Albert and the Cosby Kids (1980)
Sport Billy (1980)
The Kid Super Power Hour with Shazam! (1981–1982)
Gilligan%27s Planet (1982)
The Gary Coleman Show (1982)
Dungeons & Dragons (1983)
Mister T (1983)
Saturday Supercade (1983)
The Incredible Hulk (1983)
He-Man and the Masters of the Universe (1983–1984)
The New Scooby and Scrappy-Doo Show (1984)
G.I. Joe: A Real American Hero (1985)
Star Wars: Droids (1985)
Ewoks (1986)
The Transformers (1986)
Jem (1987)
Pound Puppies (1987)
The Smurfs (1987)
Garbage Pail Kids (1988)
The New Adventures of Beany and Cecil (1988)
Bill & Ted's Excellent Adventures (1990)
Monsters (1990)
Tiny Toon Adventures (1990–1992, 1995)
Cap%27n O. G. Readmore (1992)
Batman: The Animated Series (1992–1995)
Taz-Mania (1993)
Animaniacs (1994)
Freakazoid! (1995)
Superman: The Animated Series (1996–2000)
The New Batman Adventures (1997–1999)
Batman Beyond (1999–2001)

Clerks: The Animated Series (2000)
Justice League (2003)
Static Shock (2003)
Duck Dodgers (2003–2005)
Lost (2004)
Ozzy %26 Drix (2004)
Justice League Unlimited (2004)
Krypto the Superdog (2005)
The Batman (2007)
Star Wars: The Clone Wars (2008–2010)
Batman: The Brave and the Bold (2009–2011)
Sym-Bionic Titan (2010)
Tower Prep (2010)
Ultimate Spider-Man (2012–2015)
Hulk and the Agents of S.M.A.S.H. (2013–2015)
New Looney Tunes (2015)
Avengers Assemble (2016)
The 7D (2016)
Justice League Action (2016–2017)
Creepshow (2019, 2021)

Films
Tiny Toon Adventures: How I Spent My Vacation (1992)
Batman: Mask of the Phantasm (1993)
Double Dragon (1994)
Batman Beyond: Return of the Joker (2000)
Chase Me (2003)
Scooby-Doo! Abracadabra-Doo (2010)
DC Showcase: Catwoman (2011)
Scooby-Doo! and the Spooky Scarecrow (2013)
Tom and Jerry%27s Giant Adventure (2013)
Maleficent (2014) (uncredited revisions)
Tom and Jerry: Back to Oz (2016)
Scoob! Holiday Haunt (unreleased)

Bibliography

Bongo Comics
 Bart Simpson's Treehouse of Horror #2, 9 (1996, 2003)
 Simpsons Comics #52, 193 (2000, 2012)
 Simpsons Comics Winter Wingding #1, 3 (2006, 2008)

Dark Horse
 Jingle Belle vol.2 #1–4 (2004–2005)
 Jingle Belle: The Fight Before Christmas (2005)
 The Bakers Meet Jingle Belle (2006)

DC Comics
 Action Comics #975, 1000 (2017–2018)
 Adventures in the DC Universe #3 backup story (1997)
 Batgirl Adventures #1 (1998)
 Batman vol.1 #685 (2009), vol.3 Annual #1 (2016)
 Batman: Arkham City #1–4, 6–7 [digital]; #1–5 [print] (2011)
 Batman Black and White vol. 2 (2002), vol. 4 #3 (2014), vol. 5 # 1 (2020)
 Batman: Gotham Knights #14 backup story (2001)
 Batman: Harley and Ivy #1–3 (2004)
 Batman: Harley Quinn #1 (1999)
 Batman: Mr. Freeze #1 (1998)
 Batman: Streets of Gotham #1–4, 7, 10–14, 16–21 (2009–2011)
 Batman: The Adventures Continue #1–14 [digital], #1–5 [print] (2020–present)
 Batman: War on Crime (1999)
 The Batman Adventures Annual 1–2, Holiday Special, Mad Love (1994–1995)
 The Batman and Robin Adventures #1–3, 8, 17, Annual 1 (1995–1997)
 Batman and Superman Adventures: World's Finest (1997)
 Black Canary and Zatanna: Bloodspell (2015)
 Countdown to Final Crisis #51–1 (2007–2008)
 Dark Night: A True Batman Story (2016)
 DC Infinite Halloween Special #1 (2007)
 DC Nuclear Winter Special #1 (2018)
 DCU Holiday Special #1 (2009)
 Detective Comics #821–828, 831, 833–834, 837–841, 843–850, 852, 1000 (2006–2009, 2019)
 Gotham City Sirens #1–2, 4–7, 9–11 (2009–2010)
 Harley Loves Joker #1–2 (2018)
 Harley Quinn vol.3 #17–25 backup story (2017)
 JLA: Liberty and Justice (2003)
 JLA: Secret Origins (2002)
 Shazam! Power of Hope (2000)
 Superman: Peace on Earth (1998)
 Superman Adventures #1 (1996)
 Wonder Woman: Spirit of Truth (2001)
 Young Monsters in Love (2019)
 Zatanna #1–6, 8–11, 13 (2010–2011)
 Zatanna: Everyday Magic (2003)

DC Comics/Archie Comics
 Harley & Ivy Meet Betty & Veronica #1–6 (2017–2018)

Eclipse Comics
 Elvira, Mistress of the Dark #1, 8, 61 (1993, 1998)

Image Comics
 Jingle Belle: Santa Claus vs. Frankenstein (2008)
 Madame Mirage #1–6 (2007–2008)
 Top Cow Holiday Special/Jingle Belle: Grounded (2010)
 Witchblade Animated #1 (2003)

Marvel Comics
 Captain America: Red, White, & Blue (2002)

Oni Press
 Jingle Belle #1–2 (1999)
 Jingle Belle: Jubilee (2001)
 Jingle Belle: The Mighty Elves (2001)
 Jingle Belle: Winter Wingding (2002)
 Jingle Belle's All-Star Holiday Hullabaloo (2000)
 Mutant, Texas: Tales of Sheriff Ida Red #1–4 (2002)
 Oni Double Feature #13 (1999)
 Oni Press Summer Vacation Supercolor Fun Special (2000)

Awards
 Two Primetime Emmy Awards nominations as part of the creation team:
 1995, Outstanding Animated Program (For Programming One Hour or Less)
 1991, Outstanding Animated Program (For Programming One Hour or Less)
 Won seven comics industry Eisner Awards and two Harvey Awards.
 Eisner and Harvey Award in 1994 for The Batman Adventures: Mad Love; an Eisner for Batman Adventures Holiday Special in 1995, a Harvey for Batman: War on Crime in 2000.
 He received the Writer's Guild Animation Writing award in 1999, and a second WGA award for Outstanding Achievement in Writing for a Dramatic Television Series in 2006 as a member of the writing team for Lost.
 Five-time nominee of the animation industry's Annie Awards.
 Inkpot Award in 2013.

References

External links

 Paul Dini's Website
 Paul Dini's Blog
 
 
 Paul Dini at ComicVine.com
 Paul Dini at Mike's Amazing World of Comics
 Paul Dini interviewed on nerdist.com podcast, July 2016
 Write Now! issue 4 (June 2003) and issue 5 (July 2003), TwoMorrows Publishing

1957 births
21st-century American screenwriters
American bloggers
American comics writers
American male screenwriters
American people of Italian descent
Television producers from New York City
American television writers
Annie Award winners
Emerson College alumni
Inkpot Award winners
Living people
American male television writers
American writers of Italian descent
Writers from New York City
Writers Guild of America Award winners
Screenwriters from New York (state)
American male bloggers